MasterChef Thailand is the Thai version of the competitive reality TV series MasterChef which premiered on Channel 7 on February 21, 2021.

Contestants

Elimination table

 (WINNER) This cook won the competition.
 (RUNNER-UP) This cook finished in second place.
 (WIN) The cook won an individual challenge (Mystery box challenge or Invention Test).
 (WIN) The cook was on the winning team in the "Team challenge" and directly advanced to the next round.
 (HIGH) The cook was one of the top entries in an individual challenge, but didn't win.
 (IN) The cook wasn't selected as a top or bottom entry in an individual challenge.
 (IN) The cook wasn't selected as a top or bottom entry in a team challenge.
 (IMM) The cook didn't have to compete in that round of the competition and was safe from elimination.
 (PT) The cook was on the losing team in the Team challenge and competed in the Pressure test.
 (PT) The cook didn't have to compete in the Team challenge but competed in the Pressure test.
 (NPT) The cook was on the losing team in the Team challenge, did not compete in the Pressure test, and advanced.
 (RET) The cook won the Reinstation Challenge and returned to the competition.
 (LOW) The cook was one of the bottom entries in an individual challenge, but wasn't the last person to advance.
 (LOW) The cook was one of the bottom entries in an individual challenge, and the last person to advance.
 (LOW) The cook was one of the bottom entries in the Team challenge and they were the only person from their team to advance.
 (LOW) The cook was one of the bottom entries in the Team challenge, and their team was last to advance.
 (ELIM) The cook was eliminated from MasterChef.

Episodes

Episode 1
Original airdate: 21 February 2021

Gamyui, Save, Tanwa, and View won their aprons.

Episode 2
Original airdate: 28 February 2021

Billy, Pooh, Jimmy, Ter, Sun, Nat, and Rean won their aprons.

Episode 3
Original airdate: 7 March 2021

Fah and Nun won their aprons. The judges decided to let 5 contestants to have a second chance at winning the aprons. Aib, Beam, and Lee earn the final places in the Top 16.

Episode 4
Original airdate: 14 March 2021

Team Challenge 1: Main ingredient: Whole cow
Location: The edge of Dong Phaya Yen area.

Time: 60 minutes
Bottom three groups: Fah and Billy (5), Tanwa and Sun (4), Rean and Jimmy (8)
Pressure Test 1: Thai crispy pork with rice, sauce, and soft boiled egg
Time: 45 minutes
Eliminated: Rean

Episode 5
Original airdate: 21 March 2021
Mystery Box Challenge 1: Main ingredient: Rare International Ingredients
Time: 60 minutes (1 hour)
Three best dishes: Gamyui, Ter and Save
Winner: Ter

As winner of the Mystery Box Challenge, Ter is safe and get to save 4 contestants for elimination. He chose Save, Tanwa, Sun, and Fah.

Invention Test 1: Main dishes: Chickpea Samosa and/or Chickpea Ravioli

 Saved: Ter, Save, Tanwa, Sun, and Fah 
Time: 60 minutes (1 hour)
Bottom three: Nun, View and Beam
Eliminated: View

Episode 6
Original airdate: 28 March 2021
Team Challenge 2: 

Both teams need to make and serve pies each in 1 hour.

The blue team won by serving 100 pies before the service time was over.
Winners: Blue Team

Pressure Test 2: Tomahawk steak with biscuits and gravy

Time: 60 minutes
Bottom three: Aib, Nat, and Tanwa
Eliminated: Nat

Episode 7
Original airdate: 4 April 2021

Mystery Box Challenge 2: The contestants must make a desert with high quality ingredients such as, honey, young coconut, cinnamon, ginger and paprika.
Time: 60 minutes (1 hour)
Three best dishes: Save, Sun, and Jimmy
Winner: Save

As winner of the Mystery Box Challenge, Save is safe.

Skills Test 1: The contestants must carve a whole salmon as close to perfection according to Chef Ian's demo.
Time: 30 minutes
Aib and Gamyui won the Skills Test but Gamyui carve the salmon close to perfection.
Winners: Aib and Gamyui
Bottom 2: Ter and Sun
Eliminated: Sun

Episode 8
Original airdate: 11 April 2021
Team Challenge 3: 

Both teams need to make and serve a Tom Yum Sea 2 hours in cooking and 1 hour in serving.

The red team won by a score of 75 to the blue team's 25.
Winners: Red Team

Pressure Test 2: Chocolate lava cake with green tea ice cream and crumbling almonds

Time: 40 minutes
Bottom 2: Jimmy and Nun 
Eliminated: Nun

Episode 9
Original airdate: 18 April 2021

Mystery Box Challenge 3: Main Ingredient: Native Lethocerus Indicus

Time: 60 min. (1 hour)
Three best dishes: Beam, Tanwa and Billy
Winner: Billy

Invention Test 2: Main ingredients, each box in different amount

For this week's invention test, there are three boxes. Each box has different amount of main ingredients. There are three boxes of ingredients including:

-Box 1: Lamb Ribs

-Box 2: Lamb Ribs, Bananas and Pickled Fish

-Box 3: Lamb Ribs, Bananas, Pickled Fish, Yellow Plum, Mackerel, Giant Catfish Spawn and Chocolate

Since Billy was the winner of the Mystery Box Challenge, he gets to choose a box for each contestants. 

Time: 60 min. (1 hour)

After the judges have tasted all ten dishes, Jimmy did the best, Lee in second. Both of them will be placed as team captains for next week.
Winner: Jimmy
Bottom three: Tanwa, Aib and Save
Eliminated: Aib

Episode 10
Original airdate: 25 April 2021
Team Challenge 4:

Both teams need to prepare appetizers, soup, main course, and dessert and serve in Chinese tables theme at the wedding of Ball, a contestant from MasterChef Thailand Season 3, for 160 guests in 3 hours. Also in each course need to serve every 15 minutes.

The blue team won by a score of 94 to the red team's 86.
Winners: Blue Team

Pressure Test 3: Egg Benedict with only 5 eggs

Time: 25 minutes
Bottom 3: Save, Fah and Tanwa
Eliminated: Save

Episode 11
Original airdate: 16 May 2021

Mystery Box Challenge 4: The contestants must make a dish with high quality ingredients such as, otoro fish, wagyu beef, fogras, taraba crab legs, truffles, japanese bunching onions, asparaguses, strawberries, corns, gold leafs and caviar.
Time: 30 minutes
Challenge Winners: Lee, Jimmy and Gamyui
Winner: Lee
As winner of the Mystery Box Challenge, Lee is safe.

Invention Test 3: Since Lee got privilege to control the invention test. Lee got safe and can choose main ingredient to other contestants. Which the main ingredients are in group of "low quality ingredients" which are pork liver, pork stomach and pork lungs. Lee choose pork liver to Fah and Gamyui. Choose pork stomach to Billy, Beam and Pooh. Choose pork lungs to Jimmy, Ter and Tanwa.
Time: 60 minutes
Winner: Pooh
Bottom Three: Jimmy, Fah, Tanwa
Eliminated: Fah, Tanwa

References

2021 Thai television seasons
MasterChef Thailand